Granville Pearl Harrison (July 1, 1917 – December 13, 1997) was an American football player. 

A native of Ashland, Mississippi, Harrison played college football at Mississippi State. 

He played professional football in the National Football League (NFL) as an end for the Philadelphia Eagles in 1941 and for the Detroit Lions in 1942. He appeared in five NFL games, one as a starter.

References

1917 births
1997 deaths
Mississippi State Bulldogs football players
Philadelphia Eagles players
Detroit Lions players
Players of American football from Mississippi
American football ends